Justin McCarthy (born 1957) is an American-born noted Indian Bharatnatyam dancer, instructor and choreographer. He teaches Bharatnatyam at the Shriram Bharatiya Kala Kendra at Delhi, where he has been for the last three decades. He moved to India in 1979, learnt Bharatanatyam from danseuse Leela Samson for ten years, before beginning to teach it at the Shriram Bharatiya Kala Kendra at Delhi, where he has teaching ever since. Prior to this he received his early training at the Dance School of Berkeley, and later trained under Subbaraya Pillai, a leading Guru of the Pandanallur style of Bharatanatyam at Chennai. He is also a pianist of Western classical music, and adept in Carnatic music.

Early life and training
Justin McCarthy was born and brought up in East Grand Rapids, Michigan, in a family with Irish descent. He graduated from East Grand Rapids High School in 1974. He learnt piano and received his early dance training at the Berkeley School of Dance. Later he moved to California, where in the mid '70s after watching a Bharatanatyam performance at the Golden Gate Park, transformed he soon started learning Bharatanatyam from two American dancers, Lesandre Ayrey and Mimi Janislauuski, students of the Balasaraswati, subsequently he decided to leave for India.

After his move to India he first trained under Subbaraya Pillai, a leading Guru of the Pandanallur style of Bharatanatyam at Chennai. Next he trained under Bharatanatyam danseuse Leela Samson for ten years at Shriram Bhartiya Kala Kendra, Delhi. Meanwhile, he also learnt Tamil and Sanskrit languages, apart from learning Carnatic music vocal.

Career
After performing as a soloist, he has been teaching Bharatanatyam at the Shriram Bharatiya Kala Kendra in Delhi for last two decades. He is also the Director of performing Arts at Ashoka University.

Apart from a Western classical pianist, he is also a keyboardist, plays harpsichord, a baroque keyboard instrument and teaches piano to young children. He has been living in Delhi for the past 30 years and has acquired Indian citizenship.

Justin entered dance choreography in the early 1990s with a poem from Sangam literature, Madurai Kanchi, still one of his noted works. Having learnt Carnatic music, he also compose music for his choreographic works. His choreographed Kshetrayya, based on the imagined life of a 17th-century poet-musician by the same name, was a "hit", and his 2009 production, Rajavilasam — Splendours of the Courtesans performed by Gati Forum also received rave reviews.

In 2010, his dance repertoire troupe, presented a production Lokaalokam, a fusion of three Indian classical dance forms, Chhau, Kathak and Bharatanatyam at the "Ananya Dance Festival" in Delhi's 16th-century Purana Qila.

References

Bharatanatyam exponents
Performers of Indian classical dance
1957 births
Living people
Naturalised citizens of India
American emigrants to India
Indian dance teachers
American people of Irish descent
Indian classical pianists
American classical pianists
Male classical pianists
American male pianists
Indian people of Irish descent
American male artists of Indian descent
American male artists
American artists
People from East Grand Rapids, Michigan
20th-century American pianists
Former United States citizens
20th-century American male musicians